Greatest Hits is the first compilation album by American country music artist Billy Dean. It reprises his first nine singles, presented in chronological order from 1991's "Only Here for a Little While" to 1993's "I'm Not Built That Way", as well as the track "Once in a While", which was also included on the soundtrack to the 1994 film 8 Seconds. The album was certified gold by the RIAA.

Track listing

Chart performance

References
Allmusic (see infobox)

1994 greatest hits albums
Billy Dean albums
Liberty Records compilation albums